The England Hockey Men's Championship Cup is a field hockey cup competition organised by England Hockey that features men's teams from England. The competition was originally known as the National Clubs Championship. The inaugural competition was won by Hounslow in 1971–72. It has also been known as the Hockey Association Cup and the EHA Cup.

Finals

National Clubs Championship

Hockey Association Cup

Notes

EHA Cup

Notes

EH Men's Championship Cup

Notes

See also
Men's England Hockey League
Women's England Hockey League
England Hockey Women's Championship Cup

References

England
1971 establishments in England